To Travel Sideways is the tenth studio album released by the American musical group Kid Creole and the Coconuts. It was the first of two albums released by the group in 1995.

Reception

Track listing

References

1995 albums
Kid Creole and the Coconuts albums